is a Japanese ghost story (kaidan) of broken trust and broken promises, leading to a dismal fate. Alternatively referred to as the  tradition, all versions of the tale revolve around a servant, who dies unjustly and returns to haunt the living.

History
The story of the death of Okiku first appeared as a bunraku play called Banchō Sarayashiki in July 1741 at the Toyotakeza theater. The familiar ghost legend had been adapted into a ningyō jōruri production by Asada Iccho and Tamenaga Tarobei I.  Like many successful bunraku shows, a kabuki version followed and in September 1824, Banchō Sarayashiki was staged at the Naka no Shibai theater starring Otani Tomoemon II and Arashi Koroku IV in the roles of Aoyama Daihachi and Okiku.

A one-act kabuki version was created in 1850 by Segawa Joko III, under the title Minoriyoshi Kogane no Kikuzuki, which debuted at the Nakamura-za theater and starred Ichikawa Danjūrō VIII and Ichikawa Kodanji IV in the roles of Tetsuzan and Okiku.  This one-act adaptation was not popular, and quickly folded, until it was revived in June 1971 at the Shinbashi Enbujō theater, starring the popular combination of Kataoka Takao and Bando Tamasaburō V in the roles of Tetsuzan and Okiku.

The most familiar and popular adaptation of Banchō Sarayashiki, written by Okamoto Kido, debuted in February 1916 at the Hongō-za theater, starring Ichikawa Sadanji II and Ichikawa Shōchō II in the roles of Lord Harima and Okiku. It was a modern version of the classic ghost story in which the horror tale was replaced by a deep psychological study of the two characters' motivations.

Plot summary

Folk version
Once there was a beautiful servant named Okiku.  She worked for the samurai Aoyama Tessan.  Okiku often refused him when he said he was in love with her and wanted to marry her, so he tricked her into believing that she had carelessly lost one of the family's ten precious Delft  plates. Such a crime would normally result in her death. In a frenzy, she counted and recounted the nine plates many times.   However, she could not find the tenth and went to Aoyama in guilty tears.  The samurai offered to overlook the matter if she finally became his lover, but again she refused.  Enraged, Aoyama threw her down a well to her death.

It is said that Okiku became a vengeful spirit (Onryō) who tormented her murderer by counting to nine and then making a terrible shriek to represent the missing tenth plate – or perhaps she had tormented herself and was still trying to find the tenth plate but cried out in agony when she never could. In some versions of the story, this torment continued until an exorcist or neighbor shouted "ten" in a loud voice at the end of her count. Her ghost, finally relieved that someone had found the plate for her, haunted the samurai no more.

Ningyō Jōruri version
Hosokawa Katsumoto, the lord of Himeji Castle, has fallen seriously ill.  Katsumoto's heir, Tomonosuke, plans to give a set of 10 precious plates to the shōgun to ensure his succession.  However, chief retainer Asayama Tetsuzan plots to take over.  Tomonosuke's retainer, Funase Sampei Taketsune is engaged to marry a lady in waiting, Okiku.  Tetsuzan plans to force Okiku to help him murder Tomonosuke.

Tetsuzan, through the help of a spy, steals one of the 10 plates and summons Okiku to bring the box containing the plates to his chamber. There, he attempts to seduce Okiku. She refuses due to her love for Taketsune. Rejected, Tetsuzan then has Okiku count the plates to find only nine.  He blames her for the theft and offers to lie for her if she will be his mistress. Okiku again refuses and Tetsuzan has her beaten with a wooden sword.

Tetsuzan then has her suspended over a well and, erotically enjoying her torture, has her lowered into the well several times, beating her himself when she is raised.  He demands that she become his lover and assist in the murder of Tomonosuke. She refuses again, whereupon Tetsuzan strikes her with his sword, sending her body into the well.

While wiping clean his sword, the sound of a voice counting plates comes from the well. Tetsuzan realizes that it is the ghost of Okiku but is entirely unmoved.  The play ends with the ghost of Okiku rising from the well, Tetsuzan staring at her contemptuously.

Okamoto Kido version
Set in Edo in 1655, a vassal of the Shogun, Aoyama Harima, has fallen in love with a young servant girl, Okiku. Aoyama has promised to marry her but has recently received an auspicious marriage proposal from an aunt.  Aoyama promises Okiku that he will honor their love and refuse the proposal.

Okiku doubts and tests him by breaking one of the 10 heirloom plates that are the treasure of the Aoyama household.  The traditional punishment for breaking one of the plates is death, which is demanded by Aoyama's family.

At first, Aoyama is convinced that Okiku broke the plate by accident and pardons her, but when Okiku reveals that she broke the plate on purpose in order to test his love, Aoyama is enraged and kills her.  He then throws her body down a well.

From then after, Okiku's yūrei (ghost) is seen to enter the house and count the plates, one through nine.  Encountering her in the garden, Aoyama sees that her ghostly face is not one of vengeance, but beauty and calm.  Taking strength from this, he commits seppuku and joins her in death.

Okamoto's version is notable for being a much more romantic adaptation of the story, similar to the kabuki version of Botan Dōrō.  This was an influence of the Meiji Restoration, which brought Western plays to Japan for the first time.  Western plays were much more noticeable for romantic elements, and this was adapted into a style of theater known as Shin Kabuki, or New Kabuki.  Shin Kabuki was ultimately an unsuccessful merger of East and West, although Okamoto's Banchō Sarayashiki remains as one of the few classics.

Variations
In some versions of the tale, Okiku is a maid who incurs her mistress' jealousy. Her mistress breaks one of the dishes that Okiku is responsible for and Okiku commits suicide. Similar to the other versions, her ghost is heard counting the plates, but her mistress goes insane and dies.

Okiku and ukiyo-e
Like many kabuki plays, Okiku was a popular subject matter for ukiyo-e artists.  In 1830, Katsushika Hokusai included her as one of the kaidan in his One Hundred Ghost Stories (Hyaku monogatari) series.  Ekin, a somewhat notorious artist who had troubles with the law, painted a byōbu-e of Okiku being accused by Tetsuzan Aoyama and his brother Chuta.

Most notably, she appeared as one of the New Forms of Thirty-Six Ghosts by Tsukioka Yoshitoshi. His portrayal of Okiku is unusually sympathetic, particularly as ghosts were viewed as fearsome apparitions by nineteenth-century Japanese, reflecting a general trend in his later work.

Influences on Japanese culture

This larva, covered with thin threads making it look as though it had been bound, was widely believed to be a reincarnation of Okiku. The Ningyo Joruri version is set in Himeji Castle, a popular tourist attraction at the castle is Okiku-Ido, or Okiku's Well. Traditionally, this is where the hapless maid's body was thrown after being killed by Tetsuzan. Although the castle is closed at night, it is said that her ghost still rises nightly from the well, and counts to nine before shrieking and returning.

Adaptations
Manga artist Rumiko Takahashi included a parody of the legend of Okiku in her romantic comedy Maison Ikkoku. As part of an Obon event, the residents of Ikkoku-kan take part in a summer festival; Kyoko dresses up as Okiku and is supposed to hide in a shallow well.

The noted fiction writer Yūko Tsushima refers to the legend in her novel , where the main character, engaged in a romantic relationship coloured by jealousy, helps her friend clean insects from her flat. Her friend's daughter takes one to show to her father, but the insect disappears and her father tells her that it was probably a Chrysanthemum beetle that turned into a white butterfly. He then tells her of Okiku, a maid who put a needle on her master's (her lover) plate and was murdered as punishment, and whose vengeance lives on in the form of the beetle.

Another adaptation was made in 2002, in Story 4 of the Japanese television drama Kaidan Hyaku Shosetsu.

Okiku and her legend also appear in Rin Chupeco's 2014 horror novel The Girl From the Well and its sequel, The Suffering. In this adaptation, Okiku is a vengeful spirit who punishes child murderers.

The Ring is a horror-film franchise featuring Sadako (or Samara). Sadako is a girl that died in a well and seeks revenge by making a haunted videotape and killing whoever views it. Her appearance and traits are based on the Okiku legend. Sadako is depicted as meeting Okiku in the manga series Sadako at the End of the World.

See also

Yotsuya Kaidan
Kaidan
Onryō
Obake
Yūrei
Japanese mythology
Japanese horror
The Girl from the Well

Notes

References
Addiss, Steven, Japanese Ghosts and Demons, USA, GeorgeBraziller,  Inc., 1986, 

Ross, Catrien, Supernatural and Mysterious Japan, Tokyo, Japan, Tuttle Publishing, 1996,

External links

Kaidan Hyaku Shosetsu (Story 4) (2002) at JDorama
Original version of the story 

Japanese ghosts
Japanese folklore
Japanese horror fiction
Edo-period works
Kabuki
Bunraku plays
1741 plays
Culture in Hyōgo Prefecture
Female legendary creatures